Norman Stone (8 March 1941 – 19 June 2019) was a British historian and author. He was Professor of European History in the Department of International Relations at Bilkent University, having formerly been a professor at the University of Oxford, a lecturer at the University of Cambridge, and an adviser to British Prime Minister Margaret Thatcher. He was a board member of the Center for Eurasian Studies (AVIM), and devoted some of the last years of his life to promoting Armenian genocide denial.

Early life and education
Stone was born in Kelvinside, Glasgow, the son of Mary Robertson (née Pettigrew, died 1991), a schoolteacher, and Norman Stone, a flight lieutenant and Spitfire pilot in World War II who fought in the Battle of Britain. He attended the Glasgow Academy on a scholarship for the children of deceased servicemen – his father having been killed in a training accident in 1942 – and graduated from Gonville and Caius College, Cambridge, with first class honours in Part II of the History tripos (1959–62). Following his undergraduate degree, Stone did research in Central European history in Vienna and Budapest (1962–65), studying archives on the Austro-Hungarian Army from the years before 1914. During this period he spent three months imprisoned in Bratislava, having been caught trying to smuggle a Hungarian dissident in his car boot across the Iron Curtain at the Czech–Austrian border.

Career

Cambridge
Stone did not complete his doctorate, having been offered a research fellowship by Gonville and Caius College, where he later became an assistant lecturer in Russian and German History (1967), and a full lecturer (1973). In 1971, he transferred from Caius to Jesus College. While Stone was well regarded as a teacher, over time he increasingly neglected his duties.

Oxford
Stone was appointed in 1984 as Professor of Modern History at Oxford University, England. Stone's tenure at Oxford was not without controversy. Petronella Wyatt wrote that Stone "loathed the place as petty and provincial, and for its adherence to the Marxist-determinist view of history." During his period at Oxford Stone gained a reputation for groping female students.

Stone published a column in The Sunday Times between 1987 and 1992, and was also employed by the BBC, the Frankfurter Allgemeine Zeitung, and The Wall Street Journal. Stone became Margaret Thatcher's foreign policy advisor on Europe, as well as her speechwriter.

In May 1994 Stone gave a half-hour Opinions lecture televised on Channel 4 and subsequently published in The Independent. That newspaper later reviewed the lecture as "Little England has never had such great lines: there were the Germans (They want to be good Europeans because it stops them being bad Germans), and the Scandinavians (They only unite around the principle of finding the goody-goody Swedes very irritating)... But as he led us through the corridors of EC lunacy, you saw the point: only through a Lewis Carroll mirror could you meet such grotesques as the Gatt kings: Not so long ago a cow cost more than a student. Nowadays, a non-cow costs even more ... On 1 September 1939, the League (of Nations) ignored Hitler's invasion of Poland because it was embarrassing, it moved instead to discuss the standardisation of level-crossings."

Turkey
In 1997, Stone retired from his chair at Oxford and left to teach at the department of International Relations at Bilkent University, Ankara. As an example of Stone's wit and acute understanding, Niall Ferguson shares in his obituary paper the answer Stone gave when asked why he had moved: "in the depth of my being, I'm a Scotsman and feel entirely at home in an enlightenment that has failed".

In 2005 Stone transferred to Koç University, Istanbul. He later returned to Bilkent University to teach for the 2007–2008 academic year. He guest lectured at Boğaziçi University, Istanbul. After moving to Turkey, Stone became a frequent contributor to Cornucopia, a magazine about the history and culture of Turkey. In 2010, Stone published a book on Turkish history, from the 11th century to the present day, Turkey: A Short History.

Views
Stone was criticised for an obituary he wrote in 1983 for the London Review of Books of E. H. Carr, denouncing Carr's support of the Soviet Union, which some felt bordered on the defamatory.

In 1990 Stone was one of the historians behind the setting up of the History Curriculum Association. The Association advocated a more knowledge-based history curriculum in schools. It expressed "profound disquiet" at the way history was being taught in the classroom and claimed that the integrity of history was threatened.

Stone questioned the use of the word genocide in connection with the deaths of approximately 1.5 million Armenians in the Ottoman Empire during World War One, arousing significant controversy. In 2004, he took part in a notable letter exchange on the pages of The Times Literary Supplement, where he strongly criticized Peter Balakian's 2003 book The Burning Tigris, saying that Balakian "should stick to the poems". Stone praised Guenter Lewy, Bernard Lewis and France-based scholar Gilles Veinstein, all of whom do not believe a genocide took place.

In 2009, he argued: "The myth of Winston Churchill is dangerous. Was it a sensible strategy in 1944 and 1945 to bomb Germany to bits? It was very bad realpolitik, whatever its moral purpose."

In his obituary of Stone in The Guardian, the historian Richard J. Evans stated that unlike Niall Ferguson or A.J.P. Taylor, ''Stone's provocations were little more than the voicing of his own personal political prejudices, and so had little or no effect on the way we think about the past".

Stone described John Keegan's The Second World War as his preferred book on WWII, saying: 'There have been many and varied, and sometimes splendid, books on The Second World War, but my own preference is John Keegan's The Second World War (1990)'.

Writing
Stone's book of greatest note is The Eastern Front 1914-1917 (1975) which won the Wolfson History Prize. He also wrote Hitler (1980), Europe Transformed 1878–1919 (1983), which won the Fontana History of Europe Prize, and World War I: A Short History (2007).

Personal life
While in Vienna in the 1960s, Stone met (Marie) Nicole Aubry, the niece of the finance minister in "Papa Doc" Duvalier's Haiti dictatorship. They married on 2 July 1966 and had two sons, Nick (born 1966), a thriller writer, and Sebastian (born 1972). Stone and his first wife divorced in 1977. On 11 August 1982, he married Christine Margaret Booker (née Verity), a leading member of the British Helsinki Human Rights Group. They had a son, Rupert (born 1983), and remained married until her death on 15 November 2016. According to Evans, he suffered from alcoholism.

Stone owned a house in the Galata neighbourhood of Istanbul, and divided his time between Turkey and England. He spent the last years of his life in Budapest.

Published works 
The Eastern Front, 1914–1917 (1975); 
Hitler (1980);  Hodder and Stoughton
Europe Transformed, 1878–1919 (1983), ; 2nd ed. (1999); 
The Makers of English History (1987),  (ed.) Weidenfeld and Nicolson
Czechoslovakia: Crossroads and Crises, 1918–88 (1989); 
The Times Atlas of World History (1989);  (ed.)
The Other Russia (1990);  (with Michael Glenny)
Turkey in the Russian Mirror, in Ljubica Erickson and Mark Erickson (ed.), Russia: War, Peace and Diplomacy. Essays in Honour of John Erickson, London: Weidenfeld & Nicolson, 2005, pp. 86–100.
Islam in Turkey, in Caroline Y. Robertson-von Trotha (ed.), Europa in der Welt – die Welt in Europa (= Kulturwissenschaft interdisziplinär/Interdisciplinary Studies on Culture and Society, Vol. 1), Baden-Baden: Nomos, 2006, pp. 139–145.; 
World War One: A Short History (2007);  Penguin Press
The Atlantic and Its Enemies: A Personal History of the Cold War (2010);  Allen Lane
Turkey: A Short History (2010), ; Thames & Hudson
World War Two: a Short History (2013), Allen Lane/Basic Books
Hungary: a Short History (2019), Profile Books

References

External links
"Russia – Getting Too Strong for Germany" 
Interview with Stone on "New Books in History"

1941 births
2019 deaths
Alumni of Gonville and Caius College, Cambridge
Deniers of the Armenian genocide
Academic staff of Bilkent University
British military historians
Fellows of Jesus College, Cambridge
Fellows of Trinity College, Cambridge
Fellows of Worcester College, Oxford
People educated at the Glasgow Academy
Writers from Glasgow
Scottish expatriates in Hungary
Scottish expatriates in Turkey
20th-century Scottish historians
20th-century British educators
21st-century British educators
21st-century Scottish historians